Engelbert Holderied (26 June 1924 – 22 October 1994) was a German ice hockey player. He competed in the men's tournament at the 1952 Winter Olympics.

References

External links
 

1924 births
1994 deaths
Germany men's national ice hockey team coaches
Olympic ice hockey players of Germany
Ice hockey players at the 1952 Winter Olympics
Sportspeople from Füssen